Janine Chang Chun-ning (born September 4, 1982) is a Taiwanese actress and film producer. Chang attended National Taipei University and obtained a bachelor's degree in law. In June 2010, Chang graduated from the Institute of Industrial Economics at National Central University with a master's degree.

Chang ranked 78th on Forbes China Celebrity 100 list in 2019.

Personal life 
In March 2021, Chang announced support for cotton from Xinjiang in China, after some companies had expressed concerns about human rights abuses there.

Filmography

Film

Television series

Micro-film

Variety show

Music video appearances

Theater

Discography

Singles

Awards and nominations

References

External links 

 
 
 

1982 births
Living people
Taiwanese film actresses
Taiwanese television actresses
21st-century Taiwanese actresses
National Central University alumni
Actresses from Munich
National Taipei University alumni